National Foster Care Month is observed in the United States during the month of May every year. It began with President Ronald Reagan in 1988.  Since 1988, National Foster Care Month continues to be recognized and celebrated.

Overview
The original focus was to give foster parents the recognition they deserved for opening their homes to foster children in need and caring for them. However, the main focus and theme changes with every passing year. For example, in 2019, the theme for National Foster Care Month was "Foster Care as a Support to Families, not a Substitute for Parents". The main focus is focus on promoting family well-being with resources that highlight community involvement, collaborative relationships, and targeted support services as key factors in supporting family preservation and keeping families healthy, together, and strong.

As of 2018, it is estimated that over 440,000 children are in foster care.

Some of these children are not eligible for adoption, but many of them are. Every year, over 30,000 children age out of the foster system without a chance at permanence, which means the foster children are reaching the age of eighteen, no longer wards of the state, and out on their own. This means that the youth over the age of eighteen have no familial support, resources, or even job or life skills. These facts have fueled the motivation behind National Foster Care Month.

Presidential Action 
Every year the current President of the United States issues a Presidential Proclamation specifically on National Foster Care Month.

When President Reagan issued the first Presidential proclamation that established May as National Foster Care Month.

National Foster Youth Shadow Day 
Organized by the Congressional Caucus on Foster Youth, the annual National Foster Youth Shadow Day draws more than 60 current and former foster youth to the nation’s capital. The young people have meetings at the White House with members of the administration and spend a day shadowing their member of Congress in the Capitol to tell their stories.

In 2014, television personality Dr. Phil McGraw testified before the House Ways and Means Committee on National Foster Youth Shadow Day about the problem of foster youth being over-medicated with psychotropic drugs.

Supporters
National Foster Care Month is supported and maintained by the Children's Bureau, Children Welfare Information Gateway, and their partners. In addition, the National Resource for Permanency and Family Connections,  the National Foster Youth Institute, the Casey Family Programs, Foster Club, and the Congressional Caucus on Foster Youth.

References

Further reading
 Out of Home Care
During National Foster Care Month, City Launches Campaign Focusing On Fostering Of Older Youth - CBS Philly
Celebrating National Foster Care Month in Milwaukee County | FOX6Now.com
 Celebrating National Foster Care Month – May 2013 – Ukiah Daily Journal
 Commentary: We Must Care for Black Foster Youth | News | BET
 ‘Awesome’ Foster Family Day held at Fort Knox — State — Bangor Daily News — BDN Maine

Foster care